The 1904 Massillon Tigers football season  was their second season in existence. The team finished with a record of 7–0 and won their second Ohio League championship in as many years.

Schedule

Game notes

References

Massillon Tigers seasons
Massillon Tigers
Massillon Tigers